To christen is to perform the religious act of baptism.

Christen may also refer to:

People

Surname
 Adolf Christen (1811–1883), court actor, theater director and theater manager
 Andreas Christen (born 1989), footballer from Liechtenstein
 Björn Christen (born 1980), Swiss ice hockey player
 Brian Christen (1926–2000), Canadian cricketer
 Claudia Christen (born 1973), Swiss designer
 Georges Christen (born 1962), Luxembourgian strongman
 Mathias Christen (born 1987), footballer from Liechtenstein
 Morgan Christen (born 1961), American judge
 Siena Christen, German paralympic athlete
 Theophil Friedrich Christen (1879–1920), Swiss scientist

Given name
 Christen Aagaard (1616–1664), Danish poet
 Christen Thorn Aamodt (1770–1836), Norwegian priest
 Christen Larsen Arneberg (born 1808), Norwegian politician
 Christen Thomsen Barfoed (1815–1899), Danish chemist
 Christen Berg (1829–1891), Danish politician and editor
 Christen Gran Bøgh (1876–1955), Norwegian jurist and theatre critic
 Christen Christensen (figure skater) (1904–1969), Norwegian pair skater
 Christen Christensen (politician) (1826–1900), Norwegian military officer and politician
 Christen Christensen (shipowner) (1845–1923), Norwegian ship-owner
 Christen Collin (1857–1926), Norwegian literary historian
 Christen Dalsgaard (1824–1907), Danish painter
 Christen Drew (born 1987), former WSIL-TV news reporter
 Christen Andreas Fonnesbech (1817–1880), Danish politician
 Christen Heiberg (civil servant) (1737–1801), Norwegian civil servant
 Christen Heiberg (physician) (1799–1872), Norwegian surgeon
 Christen Nielsen Holberg (c. 1625–c. 1685), Norwegian soldier
 Christen Jensen (1881–1961), American educator
 Christen Knudsen (1813–1888), Norwegian ship-owner
 Christen Købke (1810–1848), Danish painter
 Christen Mikkelsen Kold (1816–1870), Danish teacher
 Christen Mølbach (1766–1834), Norwegian merchant and politician
 Christen Sørensen Longomontanus (1562–1647), Danish astronomer
 Christen Pram (1756–1821), Norwegian/Danish writer
 Christen C. Raunkiær (1860–1938), Danish botanist
 Christen Roper (born 1981), American college basketball athlete
 Christen Friis Rottbøll (1727–1797), Danish physician and botanist
 Christen Bentsen Schaaning (c. 1616–1679), Norwegian priest
 Christen Schmidt (1727–1804), Norwegian bishop
 Christen Thomesen Sehested (1664–1736), Danish admiral
 Christen Sveaas (born 1956), Norwegian businessperson
 Christen Andersen Vallesværd (1797–1842), Norwegian politician
 Christen Wiese (1876–1968), Norwegian sailor
 Christen Worm (1672–1737), Danish bishop

Other uses
 Christen Industries, an aircraft manufacturer

See also
 
 Chresten (disambiguation)
 Christin, a given name
 Christening (disambiguation)
 Kristin (name)
 Kristen (given name)

Surnames from given names